The 1984–85 Hellenic Football League season was the 32nd in the history of the Hellenic Football League, a football competition in England.

Premier Division

The Premier Division featured 14 clubs which competed in the division last season, along with four new clubs:
Hounslow, relegated from the Southern Football League
Morris Motors, promoted from Division One
Sharpness, joined from the Gloucestershire County League
Shortwood United, promoted from Division One

League table

Division One

Division One featured 14 clubs which competed in the division last season, along with three new clubs:
Avon Bradford, relegated from the Premier Division
Hazells, relegated from the Premier Division
Highworth Town, joined from the Wiltshire League

League table

References

External links
 Hellenic Football League

1984-85
8